Alcantarea nevaresii is a plant species in the genus Alcantarea. This species is endemic to Brazil.

References

nevaresii
Flora of Brazil